The Mughal Sarai is a caravanserai located in Surat, Gujarat, India.

History 
The sarai was built in 1644 CE.

It was briefly used to detain political prisoners during the Indian Rebellion of 1857. The clock tower was also added by the British.

Architecture 
The building reflects Mughal architecture, except for the clock tower, which was added by the British.

Inscriptions 
Inscriptions found in the sarai are now kept in the Chhatrapati Shivaji Maharaj Vastu Sangrahalaya.

References 

Buildings and structures in Surat
Mughal caravanserais
Caravanserais in India